Gleebruk was a village in the district (Kabupaten/Kota) of Aceh Besar just to the southwest of Banda Aceh, the capital of the special territory of Aceh on the island of Sumatra, Indonesia. It was completely destroyed by the tsunamis resulting from the 2004 Indian Ocean earthquake.

See also 
 Calang
 Teunom
 Meulaboh
 Tapaktuan

External links 
 DigitalGlobe analysis of Gleebruk tsunami images. (For reference only. PDF 840 KB)

Populated places in Aceh